The Calumet/Giles Prairie District is a historic district in the South Side, Chicago community area of Chicago, Illinois, United States.  The district was built between 1870 and 1910 by various architects. It was designated a Chicago Landmark on July 13, 1988.

References

External links
 Official City of Chicago Near South Side Community Map

 Prairie District Neighborhood Watch

Historic districts in Chicago
South Side, Chicago
Chicago Landmarks